Events in the year 1641 in Norway.

Incumbents
Monarch: Christian IV

Events
5 July - Kristiansand city is formally founded by King Christian IV of Denmark-Norway.

Arts and literature

 Elias Fiigenschoug's portrait of Erik Iversen Nordal, is painted. (It is located in Leikanger Church, where Nordal served as priest from 1618 to 1658).
The construction of The Old Town Hall of Oslo was finished.

Births

Deaths

See also

References